Stephen S. Gardner (December 26, 1921 – November 19, 1978) was an American businessman who served as the 10th vice chairman of the Federal Reserve from 1976 until his death in 1978.

Career
Gardner was chairman of the Girard Bank in Philadelphia. In 1973, he was appointed to an advisory group of Philadelphia business leaders by mayor Frank Rizzo. In 1974, he was given the Police Athletic League award for his bank's "distinguished service and leadership" on behalf of the group.

In 1976, he was appointed Vice Chair of the Federal Reserve by President Gerald Ford on a fourteen-year term.

Personal life
Gardner was born on December 26, 1921, in Wakefield, Massachusetts, a small town in Massachusetts. He and his wife Consuelo had three sons (Seth T., Stephen Symmes Jr., and Pierce S.) and two daughters (Susan and Hillary). His son Seth married Elizabeth Tracy Perkins, the daughter of W. B. Saunders' vice president Sherman Evarts Perkins.

He died on November 19, 1978, from cancer.

References

1921 births
1978 deaths
20th-century American politicians
Deaths from cancer in Washington, D.C.
People from Massachusetts
Vice Chairs of the Federal Reserve
Harvard College alumni
Harvard Business School alumni